The LearAvia Lear Fan 2100 was a turboprop business aircraft designed in the 1970s, with an unusual configuration. The Lear Fan never entered production.

Design and development

The LearFan was designed by Bill Lear, but not completed before his death in 1978. It was planned for production to be carried out in Belfast, Northern Ireland, in a new factory built with money from the British Government in an effort to boost employment. The aircraft had a pressurized cabin and was designed for a service ceiling of 41,000 ft (12 500 m).  It could accommodate two pilots and seven passengers, or one pilot and eight passengers.

It featured a pusher configuration in which two engines powered a single constant-speed three- or four-bladed propeller at the rear of the aircraft.  A purpose-built gearbox allowed two Pratt & Whitney Canada PT6B turboshaft engines to supply power via two independent driveshafts.  The intent of the design was to provide the safety of multi-engine reliability, combined with single-engine handling in case of failure of one of the engines.

The aircraft was made of lightweight composite materials instead of the more common aluminum alloy.

Another distinctive feature was the Y-shaped empennage.  Two stabilizers pointed upward at an angle, similar to those on a V-tail aircraft, and a short vertical stabilizer pointed downward.  However, unlike conventional V-tails, there was no pitch/yaw control mixing on the Lear Fan.  The downward-pointing rudder also served to protect the propeller from ground strikes during takeoff and landing.

Operational history
After the cancellation of a planned test flight on December 31, 1980 due to technical issues, the first prototype made its maiden flight on January 1, 1981, a date officially recorded by sympathetic British government officials as "December 32, 1980" in order to secure funding that expired at the end of 1980.

The Lear Fan, however, did not enter production.  Structural problems were discovered during the pressurization of the all-composite fuselage. The US Federal Aviation Administration refused to issue the prototype with an airworthiness certificate because of concerns that, despite having two engines, the combining-gearbox that drove the single propeller was not adequately reliable. Development was abandoned in 1985 after only three aircraft were built.

Surviving aircraft

All three Lear Fan aircraft have been preserved. They are on display at the Museum of Flight in Seattle, Washington, the Frontiers of Flight Museum in Dallas, Texas, and on static display in front of the Civil Aerospace Medical Institute in Oklahoma City, Oklahoma.

Specifications

See also

References

Citations

Bibliography

 "Lear Fan Collapses". Flight International, 8 June 1985. Sutton, UK:Business Press International. p. 30.
 McClellan, J. Mac. "Flashback to 1981:A Look Back at the Lear Fan". Flying, June 2006. Retrieved 21 November 2009.
 Taylor, John W.R. Jane's All The World's Aircraft 1982–83. London:Jane's Yearbooks, 1982. .
 Whitaker, Richard. "Lear Fan: the plastic aeroplane arrives". Flight International, 26 December 1981, pp. 1896–1901.

External links 
 
 The William P. and Moya Olsen Lear Papers at The Museum of Flight (Seattle, Wash.)

Abandoned civil aircraft projects of the United States
LearFan
Twin-engined single-prop pusher aircraft
1980s United States business aircraft
V-tail aircraft
Low-wing aircraft
Twin-engined turboprop aircraft
Aircraft first flown in 1981